Kotlik is a city in Kusilvak Census Area, Alaska, United States. At the 2010 census the population was 577, down from 591 in 2000.

Geography
Kotlik is located on the east bank of the Kotlik Slough, 35 miles northeast of Emmonak in the Yukon-Kuskokwim Delta.

The climate of Kotlik is subarctic. Temperatures range between -50 and 87. There is an average of 60 inches of snowfall and 16 inches of precipitation annually.

The Yupik village of Bill Moore's Slough is contained within Kotlik.

Demographics

Kotlik first appeared on the 1880 U.S. Census as an unincorporated Inuit village of 8 residents. In 1890, it reported 31 residents, of which 9 were native (presumably Inuit) and 22 were "Creole" (mixed Native and Russian). It did not report again on the census until 1920. It formally incorporated as a city in 1970.

As of the census of 2000, there were 591 people, 117 households, and 102 families residing in the city. The racial makeup of the city was 3.55% White, 93.57% Native American, and 2.88% from two or more races.  0.34% of the population were Hispanic or Latino of any race.

There were 117 households, out of which 70.1% had children under the age of 18 living with them, 65.0% were married couples living together, 11.1% had a female householder with no husband present, and 12.8% were non-families. 10.3% of all households were made up of individuals, and 3.4% had someone living alone who was 65 years of age or older.  The average household size was 5.05 and the average family size was 5.48.

In the city, the age distribution of the population shows 48.2% under the age of 18, 11.2% from 18 to 24, 24.9% from 25 to 44, 12.0% from 45 to 64, and 3.7% who were 65 years of age or older.  The median age was 18 years. For every 100 females, there were 114.1 males.  For every 100 females age 18 and over, there were 109.6 males.

The median income for a household in the city was $37,750, and the median income for a family was $37,969. Males had a median income of $29,583 versus $16,875 for females. The per capita income for the city was $7,707.  About 18.4% of families and 21.1% of the population were below the poverty line, including 21.8% of those under age 18 and 25.9% of those age 65 or over.

Education
K-12 students attend Kotlik School, operated by the Lower Yukon School District.

References

External links
 Kotlik Community Planning

Cities in Alaska
Cities in Kusilvak Census Area, Alaska
Yukon River